The Downs Festival is a (usually) two day arts festival which takes place on The Downs, Bristol annually, with the first event being held on September 4, 2016 with the headliner being the Bristol-based trip-hop band Massive Attack.

Over the years, it has hosted the likes of Elbow, Groove Armada, Noel Gallagher's High Flying Birds and IDLES.

History

2016 
2016 was the inception of what is now known as The Downs Festival. This event had the trip-hop band Massive Attack headlining, with other acts including Primal Scream, Skepta and Savages. This year was also plagued by inclement weather, with there being a torrential downpour for most of the day - this has been described as "the foulest weather I have ever encountered outside of a sci-fi film" by a reviewer.

2017 
The headliner for 2017 was the British rock band Elbow. Other acts for this year included De La Soul, Mike Skinner, and Seasick Steve. This time round, the weather proved to be much more promising, with "a colourful helter skelter" and "acres of food vans".

2018 
This year held Noel Gallagher's High Flying Birds (and Paul Weller), The Heavy, Goldie, and Basement Jaxx.  This year, there were problems with queuing for toilets and adequate bins, as one attendee would describe it as "this event took the form of lining up for the bogs (that and bin-dodging, as the carpet of crushed, crunching cans underfoot)"

2019 

The most recent occurrence of the festival was during the final weekend of August 2019. This year saw the Bristol-based punk rock band IDLES and Irish post-punk band Fontaines D.C., with Lauryn Hill and Grace Jones headlining the Saturday night. Other acts included Heavy Lungs on the Information Stage joined by DITZ, Talk Show and Milo's Planes.

References 

Music festivals in Bristol
2016 establishments in England
Music festivals established in 2016
The Downs, Bristol